Afonso Duarte Costa (born 20 March 1996) is a Portuguese rower. He competed in the 2020 Summer Olympics.

References

External links
 
 
 

1996 births
Living people
Portuguese male rowers
Olympic rowers of Portugal
Rowers at the 2020 Summer Olympics
Sportspeople from Lisbon